Professor Ranbir Singh is the founding Vice-Chancellor of National Law University, Delhi established by the Government of Delhi in 2008.He is working as legal advisor of Prime Minister. He was the founding Vice-Chancellor of Nalsar University of Law, Hyderabad established by Andhra Pradesh state government. He had been there for 10 years and India today magazine rated the University one of the best university in India. Which was started with 20 students only. On his name legal research centre has been established.

Personal life
He born in Atta village of Panipat, Haryana.

References

1949 births
Living people
Indian academic administrators